Bhupesh Baghel (born 23 August 1960) is an Indian politician serving as the third and current Chief Minister of Chhattisgarh. He was president of Chhattisgarh Pradesh Congress. He has been member of legislative assembly five times from Patan. He had been cabinet minister in undivided Madhya Pradesh in Digvijaya Singh government in late nineties. He was first Minister for Revenue, Public Health Engineering and Relief Work of Chhattisgarh.

Background
Bhupesh Baghel was born on 23 August 1960 in Durg district. He is the son of Nand Kumar Baghel and Bindeshwari Baghel. His family's primary occupation is agriculture.

Personal life 
He is married to Mukteshwari Baghel. They have one son and three daughters. Baghel belongs to Other Backward Class Kurmi community and he had been an OBC face of the Congress for long in the state of Chhattisgarh. His wife, Mukteshwari Baghel, is the daughter of famous Hindi writer Dr. Narendra Dev Verma and niece of spiritual leader Swami Atmanand.

Political career

Beginning and rise 
Bhupesh Baghel started his political career from Indian Youth Congress and became member of All India Congress Committee, he was also the General Secretary, and Program Coordinator of Pradesh Congress Committee. He was elected to Madhya Pradesh Legislative Assembly in 1993 for the first time from Patan, and was later elected five times from same seat.

Baghel was appointed as Minister of State, Chief Minister related, Public Grievances Redressal (Independent Charge), M.P. Governance in Digvijay Singh’s cabinet in December 1998 and became Minister of Transport in December 1999.

After the state of Chhattisgarh was formed in November 2000, he became member of Chhattisgarh Legislative Assembly, and appointed as Minister, Revenue Rehabilitation, Relief Work, Public Health Mechanics under CG Governance. He again became MLA in 2003 state election from same seat. He lost the Patan assembly seat in 2008 elections. He also lost Parliamentary elections in 2009 from Raipur .

He again won Patan Vidhan Sabha seat in 2013 election, and became Member of Working Committee, Chhattisgarh Assembly. In 2014-15, he became Member of Public Accounts Committee, CG Government.

President of Chhattisgarh Congress 
He was President of state unit of Indian National Congress from October 2014 to June 2019. After the state's top Congress leaders like Mahendra Karma, Vidya Charan Shukla, Nand Kumar Patel and 28 others were killed in the 2013 Naxal attack in Darbha valley, Baghel played a very important role in reviving the party in the state. He managed to sideline ex-Chief Minister Ajit Jogi and his son Amit Jogi in state congress after Antagarh Assembly by-election audio tape row.

Under his presidency Chhattisgarh Congress won the 2018 Chhattisgarh Legislative Assembly election by a thumping majority.

Positions held

Chief Minister of Chhattisgarh

Baghel became MLA from Patan assembly seat again and became the Chief Minister of the state defeating BJP’s Raman Singh, after leading the opposition in Chhattisgarh State Assembly for 15 years. He took oath as chief minister on 17 December 2018. He was replaced by Kondagaon MLA Mohan Markam as PCC President in June 2019.

Baghel fulfilled two major poll promises farm loan waiver and raising paddy support price by 50% in relatively quicker way, the order letter was released dramatically, within hours of oath taking ceremony, though actual money transfer to farmers took days, weeks and months in some cases. Tendu patta collection prices were increased. Government took a major step away from shiksha-karmi (temporary teacher) policy and vacancy for posts of 15,000 permanent teachers was announced.

Welfare schemes

Narva, Garva, Ghurva, Bari 
Bhupesh Baghel is the architect of this innovative scheme. The objective of this scheme is to revive the agricultural economy by striking a balance between modernity and traditions. The scheme has been launched to ensure water conservation, livestock protection and development, use of organic compost through household waste and cultivation of fruits and vegetables in backyards for self consumption and earning additional income.

Rural Development, Water Resources Development Department, Forest Department is being taken for Narva (rivulets and streams) related work. As of February, about 30,000 Narva have been identified and the development of about 5,000 Narva has already been completed. As of September 2022, under Garva (livestock) project, a total of 10,624 villages in the state have received approval for the construction of gauthan, of which 8,408 are already operational and 1758 are in the planning stages. Under Ghurva (compost) project, until this year, about 20 lakh quintal vermi compost has been produced by the individuals of women self-help groups in Gothans. An amount of Rs 166.84 crore has been paid as dividend to Gauthan committees and women self-help groups. At the same time, vegetable seeds and plants are being distributed under the nutrition scheme under Bari Yojana.

Rajiv Gandhi Kisan Nyay Yojana

In the state budget presented by the Chhattisgarh government, a provision of Rs 5700 crore was made for the welfare of farmers through which Rajiv Gandhi Kisan Nyay Yojana was launched on 21 May, the martyrdom day of former Prime Minister Rajiv Gandhi.

In Chhattisgarh, the total cultivable land area is 46.77 lakh hectare. 70% population of the state is engaged in agriculture and around 37.46 Lakh are farm families. The objective of this scheme is to encourage crop production and increase agricultural acreage. An amount of Rs 5750 crores is transferred to the accounts of farmers in four installments under the scheme in a year. Chhattisgarh is the only state that has been procuring paddy from farmers at Rs 2,500 per quintal, which is higher than what the Centre has set. More than 23.99 lakh farmers of the state are benefiting from this scheme. Under the scheme, a provision was made to give input subsidy to farmers producing paddy, sugarcane, maize, soyabean, pulses and oilseeds in the Kharif season 2021-22. Later, the provision of this scheme was modified to include Kodo, Kutki and Ragi, and an input subsidy of Rs.9,000 per acre is also being provided to millet farmers. The government of Chhattisgarh has also decided to include the landless agricultural laborers of the state in the second phase of the Rajiv Gandhi Kisan Nyay Yojana.

On 17 October 2022, Farmers received a total of Rs.1,745 crores to prepare for the upcoming Rabi season under this scheme. Amount as input subsidy transferred directly into the bank accounts of 23.99 lakh farmers in the state. The state government has given farmers Rs.16,416.10 crores since its commencement. Farmers who plant trees in the fields will also be given an input subsidy of Rs.10 thousand per year. Chief Minister said Chhattisgarh is the first state in the country, which has ensured social and economic rights for all through its 'Nyay' schemes, namely Rajiv Gandhi Kisan Nyay Yojana (RGKNY), Godhan Nyay Yojana and Rajiv Gandhi Grameen Bhumiheen Krishi Mazdoor Nyay Yojana (RGGBKMNY).

Godhan Nyay Yojana

On 21 July 2020, the Baghel led Chhattisgarh government launched the Godhan Nyay Yojana to promote organic farming, create new employment opportunities at the rural and urban levels, promote cow rearing and cow protection, as well as to benefit cattle farmers financially. As per the scheme, the government will procure cow dung at 2 per kilogram from farmers and cattle rearers. After the procurement, the cow dung will be converted to vermicompost and other products by members of the Women Self-Help Group, which will be sold to farmers as organic manure for 8 per kilogram, thus discouraging use of chemical fertilisers.

As per a October 2022 report, 5.59 crores have been paid to the livestock owners under Godhan Nyay Yojana. Under the scheme, 1,62,497 cattle rearers of the state are benefiting, which includes 70,299 landless villagers and 44.55 percent of the beneficiaries of the Godhan Nyay Yojana are women.3,12,647 registered cow dung traders were registered in 2021–22, up from 2,45,831 in 2020–21.

On the occasion of Hareli, a traditional festival of Chhattisgarh, Chief Minister started the purchase of gaumutra (cow urine) under the scheme. The government has fixed a minimum rate of Rs 4 per liter for the purchase of cow urine. According to a Chhattisgarh government official, the procured cow urine will be used to make pest control products and natural liquid fertilizer, A total of 24,547 liters of pest controller Brahmastra and 16,722 liters of Jeevamrit have been prepared from 70,889 liters of cow urine purchased in Gauthans. Beneficiaries earned Rs.14.75 lakh from the sale of 34,085 liters of Brahmastra and Jeevamrit.

Resulting Godhan scheme opens new job avenues in Maoist-hit areas as well. Also around 300 gauthan cum industrial parks will be set up in Chhattisgarh under the Mahatma Gandhi Rural Industrial Parks (MGRIP) scheme. Prime Minister Narendra Modi has also praised the Godhan Nyaya Yojana in the seventh meeting of the Governing Council of NITI Aayog. To strengthen the economic condition of the villages, the Jharkhand, Madhya Pradesh and Uttar Pradesh governments also adopted the Chhattisgarh model. Madhya Pradesh Government will run Gobar-Dhan project for the purchase of cow dung.

Swami Atmanand English Medium School 

In Chhattisgarh, Swami Atmanand dedicated his life to serving humanity. He has selflessly devoted his life to the tribal people and inspired young people by teaching them about compassion and serving others. To honor his legacy, the Swami Atmanand English Medium School Scheme was introduced. On November 1 2020, to mark Statehood Day, Chief Minister Bhupesh Baghel unveiled the scheme.

On July 3, 2020, the state's initial Swami Atmanand School was inaugurated. 52 schools opened their doors in various cities that same year. Chief Minister Mr. Bhupesh Baghel’s vision behind this scheme is to establish educational institutions in Chhattisgarh that have excellent facilities at par with private schools but are accessible and affordable for the parents of economically weaker sections of society as well.

Bhupesh Baghel said that the government would also establish English medium government colleges in various cities across the state to increase higher education in the region. In the beginning, ten institutions will be launched in ten cities.

Encouragement towards Sports
Bhupesh Baghel the Chief Minister of India’s state Chhattisgarh, is driving the state towards a sports hub. Baghel who has taken the charges as the Chief Minister has already successfully backed and hosted Road Safety World Series at the state capital Raipur.

Chhattisgarh chief minister Bhupesh Baghel also inaugurated the state’s own Olympics, called 'Chhattisgarhiya Olympics', claiming to revive the age-old-tradition of traditional games namely langdi, bhaura, bati (kancha), and pitthul. “These games are not only entertaining but also beneficial for maintaining good physical and mental health. In rural areas, children, elderly, and youth—all will engage in these games for entertainment and to keep themselves fit”, Baghel commented.

Upliftment of tribals

Repatriation of tribal land
Under an MoU signed between the then govt and Tata Steel in 2005, agricultural land was acquired from the local tribals 10 villages around Lohandiguda in Bastar region. Despite protests from the villagers, the govt went ahead with the acquisition to build a 5.5 million tonne per annum capacity mega integrated steel plant.
Tata Steel decided to quit the project in 2016.
Immediately after coming to power, Chief Minister Bhupesh Baghel took a decision to return 4400 acres of the land to 1707 tribal families. The land was returned to the immediate owners or their legal heirs as per the provisions of the 'Right to Fair Compensation and Transparency in Land Acquisition, Rehabilitation and Resettlement Act, 2013 under the Section 101. Section 101 stipulates that if any land acquired remains underutilized for a period of 5 years from the date of taking over the possession the same shall be returned to the original owners of their legal heirs.

Health Policy

Mukhymantri Haat Bazar Clinic

The state of Chhattisgarh has 44% forest cover. Significantly large population lives in forests and remote areas. Due to neglect and difficult terrain, the population living in such areas doesn't have access to quality health care. On 2 October 2019, Baghel launched the Mukhyamantri Haat Bazaar Clinic Yojana, an innovative health care scheme is bringing health cared facilities to the doorsteps of these people. Under this scheme, mobile healthcare vans are deputed at weekly haat bazaars (local markets) which are frequented by forest dwellers selling minor forest produce. Manned by specialist doctors and other qualified staff with necessary equipments, these mobile clinics are providing quality and affordable healthcare checkup and medicine to people.

In the past four years, 1.28 lakh Haat-bazaar clinics have provided healthcare services to more than 62,47,000 individuals. The 429 medical mobile vans used to operate the 1798 haat-bazaar clinic programme. Also, the World Health Organization (WHO) has prepared a documentary film on the Haat Bazaar Clinic scheme in Chhattisgarh.

Dai-Didi Clinic 

The 'Chief Minister Dai-Didi Clinic' scheme is being run by the Urban Administration and Development Department of Chhattisgarh Government. Under the scheme, a team of female doctors and staff arrives in the vehicle of Dai-Didi Clinic's mobile medical unit and provides free treatment for various diseases to needy women and girls.

Through the scheme, about 1,475 camps have been set up in the state so far and more than 1.28 lakh women and girls living in slums of Raipur, Bilaspur and Bhilai Municipal Corporation areas have been treated near their homes.

Malaria Mukt Bastar
Malaria is a major public health concerns in India and major contributor to the malaria burden in South East Asia. Several factors contribute to the prevalence and incidences including socio-economic factors, geographical region, drug resistance. Bastar region of the state of Chhattisgarh has the highest Annual Parasite Incidence (API) (malaria) in India. Timely diagnosis due to limited infrastructure compounds the problem.

Launching the “Malaria Mukt Bastar” on 26 January 2020, the Chief Minister, Bhupesh Baghel pledged to make Bastar Malaria free in the coming days. In the first phase of the campaign, 14 lakh people were tested in Bastar, out of which 64,646 (4.60 percent) were found malaria infected. The second phase of the campaign started on 6 June and ended 31 July in which more than 23 lakh people have been examined. The process of medication of the victims has started. In March 2021, for the first time in the history of Chhattisgarh, the annual malaria parasite rate recorded lowest - API rate reached 1.17, the lowest since the formation of the state.

Mukhyamantri Suposhan Abhiyan

National Health Family Survey (NHFS)- 4 (2015–16), Chhattisgarh is one of the top states in India with high level of malnutrition and anemia among children and women. The scheme launched on 2 October 2019 on the occasion of Mahatma Gandhi’s 150 birth anniversary aims to turn Chhattisgarh into malnutrition and anemia free state in the next three years. As per a March 2020, around 68 thousand children were cured of malnutrition in one year under this campaign.

COVID-19 Management 
The state government had taken a number of actions in response to the COVID-19 pandemic to stop the disease's spread. During the lockdown, the state government announced several measures to provide relief to the affected individuals particularly the impoverished and migrant workers.

Rice was made available to all the beneficiaries under the Public Distribution System. The state's Labor Department approved Rs.3.8 crore to help workers who were impacted by the lockdown. Along with this, Bhupesh Baghel ensured the availability of hospital beds, medicine supply, PSA plant and oxygen to the hospitals with the help of state administration.

To assist a collaborative effort of UNICEF and the state government, almost 3000 volunteers have gathered in the second wave. The 'Roko Au Toko Abhiyan or 'Stop and Advice' campaign was started to raise awareness and encourage community involvement in the state's five most severely afflicted cities. These cities included Rajnandgaon, Raipur, Durg, Bilaspur, and Baloda Bazaar.

Padhai Tuhar Dwar

The campaign was launched to cover the incomplete syllabus of various classes in lockdown during the COVID-19 pandemic and to complete the syllabus in rural areas. Under Padhai Tunhar Dwar, 22 lakh children and 2 lakh teachers got benefited. The children were able to study despite the schools being closed during the lockdown. All study materials made available online. Being an e-class, each course could be viewed again and again. Under this, there was also the facility of offline studies through loudspeakers.

Between the lockdown and unlock phases, primary and middle school children in government schools received education through Mohalla Classes and the online portal Padhai Tunhar Dwar'. Committed teachers and the community turned out to support Mohalla Classrooms across the state. Extensive innovative activities were taking place in such classes following the norms specified as COVID-19 guidelines. More than 80% of the students received their education by attending Mohalla and online classes.

Every morning from 8-9:30 am and every evening from 5-6:30 pm, the residents of the villages of the Bastar district of Chhattisgarh were the audience of a special program on Amcho Bastar Radio Channel. This community radio channel was started in June 2020 under the major initiative of the Chhattisgarh State Government's Padhai Tunhar Dwar.

Mahtari Dular Yojana 
Chhattisgarh Mahatari Dular Yojana was launched in May 2021 by the state government of Chhattisgarh to help provide funds for education of children orphaned by COVID-19. Children in Classes 1 to 8 will receive a monthly allowance of Rs. 500, while those in Classes 9 to 12 would receive a monthly allowance of Rs.1,000 per month. The objective of this scheme is to motivate the students not to leave their studies midway even after losing their parents.The children of families who have lost the family's primary earner due to COVID-19 will also have their educations paid for by the state government. These youngsters will also be given preference for enrollment in the state-run Swami Atmanand English Medium Schools.

MNREGA 
Under the Mahatma Gandhi National Rural Employment Guarantee Act (MNREGA), almost 1.21 lakh families in Chhattisgarh were provided with employment for more than 100 days, which helped the rural economy remain steady despite the COVID-19 outbreak. In terms of the number of households receiving the required 100 days of employment, Chhattisgarh stands sixth in the nation.

References

External links
 
 Assembly Constituency Profile

|-

1960 births
Living people
Indian National Congress politicians
Chief Ministers of Chhattisgarh
Chief ministers from Indian National Congress
People from Durg
Chhattisgarh MLAs 2018–2023
Chhattisgarh MLAs 2003–2008
Chhattisgarh MLAs 2013–2018